The 2000 Armenian Cup was the ninth edition of the Armenian Cup, a football competition. In 2000, the tournament had 16 participants, out of which only 1 was a reserve team.

Results

First round
The first legs were played on 18 March 2000. The second legs were played on 29 March 2000.

|}

Lori and Nairi withdrew from the competition.

Quarter-finals
The first legs were played on 9 April 2000. The second legs were played on 19 April 2000.

|}

Semi-finals
The first legs were played on 4 May 2000. The second legs were played on 13 May 2000.

|}

Kilikia walked off at 51' at 0-0 during the second leg, the match was then abandoned

Final

See also
 2000 Armenian Premier League

External links
 2000 Armenian Cup at rsssf.com

Armenian Cup seasons
Armenia
Armenian Cup, 2000